Xuasús González (born in León, Spain) is a Leonese language writer.

He collaborated in Cuentos del Sil (2006) and wrote several columns for La Nuestra Tierra, a weekly newspaper in Leonese language.

See also
 Leonese language
 Leonese language writers

External links
 
 Top Level Domain for Leonese language, in Leonese language, English, Spanish, French, Italian and so oder

People from León, Spain
Leonese-language writers
Living people
Year of birth missing (living people)